Žigon is a surname. Notable people with the surname include:

Dejan Žigon (born 1989), Slovenian footballer
Helena Žigon (1928–2020), Slovenian long-distance runner 
Jelena Žigon (1933–2018), Serbian and Yugoslav actress
Stevo Žigon (1926–2005), Slovenian-Serbian actor, theatre director, and writer

Slovene-language surnames